High Treason is a 1929 film based on a play by Noel Pemberton Billing. It was directed by Maurice Elvey, and stars James Carew, Humberstone Wright, Benita Hume, Henry Vibart, Hayford Hobbs, Irene Rooke, and Jameson Thomas. Raymond Massey makes his first screen appearance in a small role. The film was initially produced as a silent but mid-way during production, Elvey was pushed by the studio to add sound to the film in order to cash in on the talkies. Although a third of the film was filmed in sound, Elvey maintained much of the silent footage and dubbed over the dialogue for shots that were originally silent, with Elvey himself voicing some of the minor characters, which he admitted when interviewed by the Mantioba Free Press shortly after the film was released in the US  Likewise, BIP's Blackmail, directed by Alfred Hitchcock was also turned into a sound picture mid-way during production (concurrently when High Treason was also in production) and many of the silent scenes used dubbed dialogue and sound effects in a similar fashion to High Treason.

The sound version of the film was presented in a London trade show on 9 August 1929, then went into UK general release in silent and sound versions on 9 September 1929. The sound version was released in the US by Tiffany Productions in a heavily cut version (running just over 60 minutes) on 13 March 1930. The silent version and a trailer for the sound version are preserved and held by the British Film Institute; the only known surviving original copy of the sound version is a lavender fine grain of the American release version held in the collection of Alaska Moving Image Preservation Association (AMIPA), which has been recently restored by the Library of Congress.

The film is a science fiction drama set in a futuristic 1940 (though this was originally set in 1950 for the silent version). The plot and aesthetics of the film are heavily influenced by Fritz Lang's Metropolis.

Plot
In 1940/50, world peace is threatened when the "United States of Europe" comes into conflict with the "Empire of the Atlantic States". The former comprises Europe, India, the Middle East, Canada, Africa, and Australasia. The latter is a combination of the United States and South America.

In the film the prohibition era in America extends to 1940 and the tension is initially caused by bootleggers crossing the borders between territories. One such incident leads to a shoot-out between border guards in which both sides suffer casualties. War looks likely, but the pacifist Peace League intervenes. Meanwhile, we learn that the tension is in fact carefully orchestrated by a sinister terrorist group financed by arms manufacturers. They blow up a rail tunnel under the English Channel. The President of Europe orders a mass enlistment and mobilisation, fearing that the Atlantic States are preparing a sneak attack.

Dr. Seymour, leader of the Peace League, desperately attempts to avert war. His daughter Evelyn seeks to convince her boyfriend Michael, commander of the European air force, not to fight, but he insists he must do his duty. Evelyn says she will leave him.

The European council are divided, but the president decides on war, saying that he will announce the outbreak of hostilities on television.

The terrorists try to kill Dr. Seymour by bombing the Peace League, but Seymour survives. He tells Evelyn to make another effort to stop Michael ordering the airforce to attack, while he appeals directly to the President. Pacifists led by Evelyn demonstrate en masse at the airfield. Michael is uncertain what to do, but Evelyn convinces him to delay the attack. Seymour confronts the President, but is forced, despite his pacifism, to shoot him to stop him making the broadcast.

Cast
Jameson Thomas as Michael Deane
Benita Hume as Evelyn Seymour
Basil Gill as President Stephen Deane
Humberston Wright as Dr. Seymour
Henry Vibart as Lord Sycamore
James Carew as Lord Rawleigh
Hayford Hobbs as Charles Falloway
Milton Rosmer as Ernest Stratton
Judd Green as James Groves
Alf Goddard as Tele-radiographer
Irene Rooke as Senator
Clifford Heatherley as Delegate
Wally Patch as Commissionaire
Raymond Massey as cabinet-maker

Critical reception
The New York Times wrote, "this story is really such a farrago of nonsense that one is sorry Maurice Elvey could not find better material to his expert hand" ; and more recently, the Radio Times wrote, "there is a sticky-backed plastic feel to the world of 1940 created by director Maurice Elvey on Gaumont's Shepherd's Bush soundstage, while the plot demonstrates a singular ignorance of political reality" ; whereas Horrornews.net wrote, "High Treason is one of the best examples of early science fiction cinema."

Updated version
In 1998, a new sound version was produced by the combined efforts of the French drum & bass DJ duo Les Electrons Libres and local film archive La Cinémathèque de Toulouse. That version was a live electronic music mix to a 71 minutes copy from the Cinémathèque vault. Les Electrons Libres version of High Treason was screened in various French cities from 1998 to 1999 (Paris, Toulouse, Bordeaux, Rennes) and in Barcelona, Spain for the 1999 Sonar Festival.

See also
 1929 in science fiction

References

External links
 AMIPA AMIPA

 La Cinémathèque de Toulouse French Wikipedia article La Cinémathèque de Toulouse French Wikipedia article. Movie projection in 2012

1929 films
British silent feature films
British science fiction films
1920s English-language films
British films based on plays
Films directed by Maurice Elvey
1920s science fiction films
Films set in London
Films set in 1940
Films set in the future
British black-and-white films
1920s British films
Silent science fiction films